"A Place Under the Sun" is the 38th single by Japanese entertainer Miho Nakayama. Written by Nakayama and Yoshimasa Inoue, the single was released on May 19, 1999, by King Records.

Background and release 
"A Place Under the Sun" was originally titled , but was retitled when Nakayama's staff pointed out that it had the same title as the song by Misia, which was released a year earlier. The song was used by Rohto Pharmaceutical for their Rohto Cure commercial featuring Nakayama.

"A Place Under the Sun" peaked at No. 40 on Oricon's weekly singles chart and sold over 10,000 copies, becoming the lowest-charting and lowest-selling single in Nakayama's career.

Track listing
All lyrics are written by Miho Nakayama; all music is arranged by Yoshimasa Inoue.

Charts

References

External links

1999 singles
1999 songs
Japanese-language songs
Miho Nakayama songs
King Records (Japan) singles